Peirspeed is an American importer and distributor of parts for motor scooters.  They previously had imported scooters from Taiwan-based TGB and an underbone motorcycle from Sachs Motorcycles.  The TGB-sourced scooters were re-branded as Peirspeed.

External links
Peirspeed

Scooter manufacturers